Justin Vaïsse (born 26 June 1973) is a French historian and intellectual. Since March 2019, he is the Director General of the Paris Peace Forum organization, an independent NGO he founded in 2018 under the impetus of French President Emmanuel Macron. The Paris Peace Forum is an annual event that aims at promoting new rules and solutions to address the global challenges of our time. Prior to this role, he was Director of Policy Planning at the French Ministry of Foreign Affairs from 2013 to 2019.

Education 
A graduate student from École normale supérieure de Saint-Cloud and Sciences Po, Vaïsse earned his PhD in history in 2005 and his habilitation à diriger des recherches in 2011.

Career 
Vaïsse was a teaching assistant at Harvard University in 1996–1997, and an adjunct professor at Sciences Po from 1999 to 2007 and at the School of Advances International Studies (SAIS, Paul H. Nitze School of Advances International Studies, Washington) at Johns Hopkins University from 2007 to 2013.

His areas of expertise include American foreign policy, transatlantic and French-American relations, and Islam in France. Dr. Vaïsse is the author or co-author of numerous books on the United States, including Neoconservatism – The Biograph of a Movement, (Harvard University Press, 2010), a book deemed “essential reading for anyone wishing to understand the contours of our recent political past” by the New York Times.

In 2006, he co-authored Integrating Islam: Political and Religious Challenges in Contemporary France (Brookings Press) with Professor Jonathan Laurence, a book named “2007 Outstanding Academic Title” by the American Library Association and subsequently translated into French.

From 2007 to 2013, Vaïsse was Director of Research for the Center on the United States and Europe and a Senior Fellow in Foreign Policy at the Brookings Institution, where he initiated several projects, including the Brookings Eurozone Survey and the European Foreign Policy Scorecard with the European Council on Foreign Relations (ECFR) – an annual evaluation of Europe's performance on the world stage.

In March 2013, Vaïsse was chosen by Laurent Fabius, the French Minister of Foreign Affairs, to helm the Ministry's Policy Planning center (Centre d'analyse, de prévision et de stratégie, CAPS). The CAPS in an internal think tank, similar to the American Policy Planning Staff in that it provides independent policy analysis and strategic advice, with a specific focus on anticipation. As Director of Policy Planning, Vaïsse became an expert on all major foreign policy topics, advised the Minister on his strategic decisions, provided background analysis and forecasts on international affairs, managed a network of policy planners, and supervised a team of high-level strategic analysts.

His biography of former National Security Adviser Zbigniew Brzezinksi was published in France in 2016 and in the US in 2018 under the title Zbigniew Brzezinski – America's Grand Strategist (Harvard University Press) to critical acclaim. Translations in Chinese and Polish are due to published in 2020.

In 2017, President Emmanuel Macron tasked Vaïsse with outlining the contours of an annual event that would respond to the growing woes of multilateralism by convening all actors of global governance once a year around major initiatives and concrete projects. The Paris Peace Forum was born the following year and its first edition coincided with the centenary of the armistice of World War I on 11 November 2018. It convened 65 Heads of State and government, 10 heads of international organization, and about 6,000 participants from civil society NGOs, the corporate world, trade unions, foundations, and think tanks.

The organization was founded as an independent NGO (association under French loi 1901) by six organizations (Sciences Po, Institut français des relations internationales (Ifri), Institut Montaigne, French Ministry of Foreign Affairs, Körber Foundation, Mo Ibrahim Foundation) and Justin Vaïsse was its first President. In early 2019, Pascal Lamy took over as president and Justin Vaïsse became Director General.

Other activities
 European Council on Foreign Relations (ECFR), Member
 French Institute of International Relations (IFRI), Member of the Strategic Advisory Board

 Personal life 
His father is prominent historian Maurice Vaïsse.

 Career overview 

 2007 –  2013: Senior Fellow, Foreign Policy Studies, and Director of Research, Center on the US and Europe, Brookings Institution
 2013 – 2019: Director of the Policy Planning staff of the French Ministry of Foreign Affairs
 2019 – present: Director General of the Paris Peace Forum

 Published works 
As author or co-author – in English

 Zbigniew Brzezinksi – America's Grand Strategist (translated by Catherine Porter), Harvard University Press, 2018
 Neoconservatism: The Biography of a Movement (translated by Arthur Goldhammer), Cambridge (MA), The Belknap Press of Harvard University Press, 2010, 376 p.
 La présidence impériale : de Franklin D. Roosevelt à George W. Bush, avec Denis Lacorne (dir.), Paris, Odile Jacob, 2007, 220 p.
 Integrating Islam: Political and Religious Challenges in Contemporary France'', with Jonathan Laurence, Washington DC, The Brookings Institution Press, 2006, 342 p.

References

External links

 Official website
 

21st-century French historians
Living people
French male non-fiction writers
1973 births